Kendra Davis Briggs (born December 19, 1974) is a Washington, D.C., lawyer who has served as a judge of the Superior Court of the District of Columbia since 2023. She previously was an assistant United States attorney from 2010 to 2023.

Education 

Briggs received her Associate of Arts from Florida A&M University and her Bachelor of Science from Florida State University in 1996 and her Juris Doctor, cum laude, from the University of Miami School of Law in 2002.

Career 

Briggs served as a law clerk to Justice Peggy A. Quince of the Florida Supreme Court. From 2002 to 2006, she was a senior associate at Parks & Crump, LLC, a Florida-based law firm, from 2006 to 2008, she served as an associate general counsel for the Florida Department of Transportation. From 2008 to 2010, Briggs was an attorney in private practice at Shook, Hardy & Bacon LLP in Washington, D.C. Since 2010, she has served an assistant United States attorney in the United States Attorney's Office for the District of Columbia; where she serves as a senior assistant United States Attorney in the Public Corruption and Civil Rights Section, where she is responsible for prosecuting civil rights offenses. Briggs also previously served as the 5th District community prosecutor.

D.C. superior court service 
On November 3, 2021, President Joe Biden nominated Briggs to serve as a judge of the Superior Court of the District of Columbia. President Biden nominated Briggs to the seat vacated by Judge Judith Bartnoff, whose term expired on September 13, 2019. On July 12, 2022, a hearing on her nomination was held before the United States Senate Committee on Homeland Security and Governmental Affairs. On September 28, 2022, her nomination was favorably reported out of committee by voice vote en bloc, with Senators Rick Scott and Josh Hawley voting "no" on record. On December 15, 2022, the Senate confirmed her nomination by voice vote. She was sworn in on January 17, 2023.

References

External links 

1974 births
Living people
21st-century American women judges
21st-century American judges
21st-century American women lawyers
21st-century American lawyers
African-American judges
American prosecutors
Assistant United States Attorneys
Florida A&M University alumni
Florida lawyers
Florida State University alumni
Judges of the Superior Court of the District of Columbia
Lawyers from Washington, D.C.
People from Miami
University of Miami School of Law alumni